(KOF XIII) is a fighting game in The King of Fighters series, developed and published by SNK Playmore originally in 2010. King of Fighters XIII was released for Japanese arcades on July 14, 2010, while ports for the Xbox 360 and PlayStation 3 were released during late 2011 in Japanese and English regions, with Atlus USA and Rising Star Games being in charge of releasing them in the United States and Europe respectively. Versions for iOS and Android followed in 2011 and 2012. A PC version was released on Steam on September 13, 2013.

The game is set after the events of The King of Fighters XI and is also the conclusion of Ash Crimson's story arc, which started in The King of Fighters 2003. It follows another King of Fighters tournament secretly hosted by Those From the Distance Land, the organization behind the events from the two prior games that are trying to break the seal of the demon Orochi and take its power.

Released after The King of Fighters XII, the game was directed by Kei Yamamoto who wanted to bring elements from prior The King of Fighters titles and fix issues from the prior game. This title significantly modifies the gameplay from its predecessor, removing some modes, and adding ones formerly used in the series. It also expands the character roster, re-grouping the playable characters into three-member teams as in the prior installments. The ports are notable for including more content than the original version such as new characters, stages and game modes. Critical reception has been positive.

Gameplay

The game removes some of the gameplay system features used in the prior game: the Guard Attack, the Critical Counter, the Clash System, as well as the dynamic, zooming camera. In their place, three new features have been added. The first of the three is the new EX Mode, which convert each character's super moves into more powerful versions that allows one bar from the player's power gauge for EX Special Moves and two bars from the player's power gauge for EX Super Special Moves. Another new feature is the Hyper Drive mode, which gives the player unlimited use of Drive Cancels for a while once the Hyper Drive Gauge has been maxed, and the last new feature confirmed for the game is the Drive Cancel, which opens up new combo possibilities. The game also marks the return of the multi-bar power gauge that was introduced in The King of Fighters '97. In addition to standard and EX Desperation Moves, a new class of Desperation Move called Neo Max is included in the game and require that three stocks of gauge be exchanged to perform one, making it similar to Hidden Super Desperation Moves from The King of Fighters 2002 and Leader Super Special Moves from The King of Fighters 2003. These can also be cancelled from standard Desperation Moves, making them similar to the Dream Cancels from The King of Fighters XI.

The console version is based on the 1.1 update of The King of Fighters XIII arcade which fixed several issues from the original version. It also contains a story mode that influenced by the player's actions with various perspectives being available. The mode is presented in visual novel style alongside fights, something considered to be hard to include in the arcade version by the SNK Playmore staff. Other modes shown are Arcade, Practice and Challenge. The online gameplay is based on the one included in later versions of The King of Fighters XII, which fixed the issues the initial one had.

Plot
The game takes place after The King of Fighters XI and is the last game of the third story arc that started in The King of Fighters 2003. The fighter Ash Crimson has absorbed the powers from two of the descendants of the clans who sealed the Orochi away 1,800 years ago, Chizuru Kagura and Iori Yagami, while Kyo Kusanagi is to be his last victim. As his former comrade, Elisabeth Blanctorche, prepares to stop him, fighters receive an invitation to another King of Fighters tournament hosted by a person labelled as "R". The tournament is sponsored by Rose who is being controlled by "Those From The Past", the organization behind the two prior tournaments that has been trying to break Orochi's seal.

When the winning team reaches the game's end, Saiki, the leader of "Those From The Past" puts his work into motion. Saiki intends to use the energy expended by the winning team to enable him to cross time. However, as the fight rages, Botan notes that the gate that links them to the past is starting to close despite the battle. Before Saiki can act, he is ambushed by Ash Crimson, who steals his power. It is revealed then that, while Ash was enlisted by Saiki to obtain the Three Sacred Treasures to power the time gate, Ash had no intention of helping Saiki. Ash is suddenly overtaken by Saiki's persona, who then attempts to cross the time gate in Ash's body. The winning team pursues him into the time gate and the final battle of The King of Fighters XIII begins inside the time gate. Saiki is defeated in the gate but persists on crossing over to the past, believing it means nothing since he can return to the past and then cross the gate again to attempt his plan anew. However, Ash halts his attempt and allows the gate to close, leaving Saiki trapped in the present. Furthermore, Ash reveals that he is a descendant of Saiki. By locking Saiki out of the gate, he denies Saiki's existence in the past and forces his own existence to cease. As Ash vanishes from the living world, the flow of time resumes. In the epilogue of the Story Mode, in the dimensional rift, a spear appeared in front of Shroom and Rimelo, two members of Those From The Past who faced Kyo in the opening of the game (Console version). More surprising, Shion appeared before them, revealed that he's still alive.

Characters

The roster of The King of Fighters XIII features all the characters who appeared in The King of Fighters XII, including the two console-exclusive characters, Elisabeth Branctorche and Mature. Three new characters come in the form of The King of Fighters '94 Women's Team (Yuri Sakazaki, King and Mai Shiranui). Unlike The King of Fighters XII, all of the characters are organized into proper teams this time with the exception of Ash, who is now a single entry character.

On April 22, 2010, Famitsu reported the addition of two new characters to the game: Vice for Iori Yagami's team and Takuma Sakazaki for the Art of Fighting team. The official website was soon updated with the changes as well as adding a storyline for Iori's team, and on the April 23, 2010 location test at Hong Kong, Hwa Jai from Fatal Fury: King of Fighters was confirmed to be in the game as the final member of Kim Kaphwan's team. The first member of the final team, K′, was revealed on April 30 with his addition to the roster page. Maxima was also revealed as the second member of K's Team via addition to the roster page on May 7 and one week later, the final character for K's Team, Kula Diamond, was introduced in the same way. Saiki, the manipulator behind the events of The King of Fighters XIII, appears as sub-boss in his awakened form, and an optional console exclusive mid-boss in his regular form, while an alternate form of Ash Crimson possessed by Saiki's soul known as Evil Ash appears as the final boss.

On June 28, 2011, Famitsu reported the addition of Billy Kane from Fatal Fury: King of Fighters as a console version exclusive character. On July 29, 2011, the human form of Saiki was also announced to be playable, while the original flame-powered Iori Yagami to be featured as a downloadable content (DLC) EX form for regular flameless Iori. Following classic Iori's appearance, Atlus announced "NESTS Style Kyo", based mostly on Kyo Kusanagi's appearance and movesets in NESTS Chronicles games (The King of Fighters '99 - The King of Fighters 2002) as a downloadable EX form for regular Kyo. As a result of a technical error, the patch was delayed to January 1, 2012, for the PlayStation 3. A new DLC including bugfixes (mainly on online mode) and Mr. Karate (Takuma Sakazaki's alter ego, but loosely based on his Honki ni Natta version from SVC Chaos: SNK vs. Capcom) as an EX form for Takuma became available on January 11, 2012.

Elisabeth Team
Elisabeth Blanctorche
Duo Lon
Shen Woo
Japan Team
Kyo Kusanagi
Benimaru Nikaido
Goro Daimon
Fatal Fury Team
Terry Bogard
Andy Bogard
Joe Higashi
Art of Fighting Team
Ryo Sakazaki
Robert Garcia
Takuma Sakazaki

Ikari Warriors Team
Leona Heidern
Ralf Jones
Clark Still
Psycho Soldier Team
Athena Asamiya
Sie Kensou
Chin Gentsai
Women Fighters Team
King
Mai Shiranui
Yuri Sakazaki
Kim Team
Kim Kaphwan
Raiden
Hwa Jai

Yagami Team
Iori Yagami
Mature
Vice
K' Team
K'
Kula Diamond
Maxima
Single Entry Mid-Bosses
Ash Crimson
Billy Kane (Added in home version and later versions)
Saiki (Added in home version and later versions, except mobile versions)
NPC Bosses
Awakened Saiki (Sub-Boss)
Evil Ash (Final Boss)
DLC EX Versions
NESTS Saga Kyo
Classic Iori
Honki ni Natta Mr. Karate (except mobile versions)

Development
SNK Playmore announced The King of Fighters XIII in February 2010. There was a preview of the game that was held on March 25, 2010, in Akihabara. The game design director, Kei Yamamoto, stated that he wanted the game to be played by the fans of the series who would be able to use their experience from prior titles. Additionally, however, he did not want the game to be too similar to its predecessors, though he and his staff's aim for the game is to capture the charm from prior titles such as readdition of gameplay rules from older titles. The gameplay was also modified to have faster battles to be enjoyed by gamers. SNK Playmore president Ryo Mizufune commented that they wanted to release a game that would surpass fans' expectations and could become as popular as The King of Fighters '98. They listened to fans' suggestions during development of the game to incorporate them.

The staff in charge wanted to pay attention to the number of details given to the game's graphics. Regarding the story, they paid attention to its flow, mentioning the final version was not significantly different from the first one. Because the prior game, The King of Fighters XII, suffered from various technical issues, developers also worked in fixing them to improve the gameplay. However, the initial arcade version from the game suffered from four notable bugs which led to special rules forbidding players to use them in at Japan's Tougeki – Super Battle Opera fighting game tournament. An updated version 1.1 was later released for arcades, fixing all the bugs and issues from the original game.

In choosing characters, developers wanted to include ones that would give a notable contrast and balance between teams rather than popularity within fans, expanding the "KOF-ism" theme. Characters like Kyo Kusanagi were made to fight at short distances rather than his original forms from the series' first two games where he relied in attacks performed from distance to emphasize the balance within the cast. The first Neo Max technique made by the staff was Kyo's. As a result, following Neo Max attacks were made to be consistent with Kyo's Neo Max in their style and damage. While Kyo often wears different outfits for story arc, he was given a more masculine appearance for The King of Fighters XIII. Artist Ogura expressed pressure in drawing this incarnation of Kyo as it had to live up to a long reputation he has had ever since his introduction.

Returning characters such as the K' Team were adjusted so that they would play in a similar fashion to prior titles, which resulted in several revisions of mechanics. King and Mai Shiranui were made based on their Art of Fighting and Fatal Fury incarnations, respectively, rather than their The King of Fighters ones. Ogura stated that designing Ash's final form was conceived shortly after he saw early designs of Saiki. Following this, Ogura tried drawing Ash's possessed form from The King of Fighters XIII where he was careful in showing that while the enemy's body is Ash's, the one fighting is Saiki as represented by his black flames. Despite early pressure about that, once seeing Saiki's similarities with Ash, Ogura managed to draw the Evil Ash easily. The idea behind this character was giving an vibe of a repulsive person.

SNK Playmore worked in order to make him balanced as they aimed for a neither superior Kyo or an inferior Kyo within the cast, giving the players their decision when choosing which version of the character would they prefer. Iori's flamewielding persona was developed to generate a contrast between him and the regular Iori.

This was the last King of Fighters game to use sprites.

Release

Home version
In June 2011, SNK Playmore confirmed that the PlayStation 3 and Xbox 360 console versions were in the works and would be released on October 27, 2011, in Japan. In September 2011, however, SNK Playmore delayed the game's release date to an unspecified one from the same year, later leaving it to December 1, 2011. The ports add several game modes not seen in the original version as well as new characters.

Atlus had confirmed that they would publish the game on October 25, 2011, in North America, but later delayed it until November 22. Pre-orders for the game included a four-CD soundtrack from the series; the preorders notably increased following the announcement. Rising Star Games confirmed the release date at October 28, 2011 in Europe.

Various new arenas were added for the home version, with some of them being originally from the Art of Fighting and Fatal Fury series. The others are based on places briefly seen in cutscenes from The King of Fighters. All of the characters had their movesets adjusted for better balance as a response to issues found in the arcade versions. Downloadable content was also made available, including variants of existing characters.

Mobile
An iOS version was also released on July 7, 2011, under the title of The King of Fighters-i. It was also brought to Android-based devices on March 22, 2012, as The King of Fighters Android.

Kei Yamamoto was also in charge of this version, but the development team consisted of another one that did not work on the arcade version. The staff had trouble adapting the game to iOS due to lack of balances of moves and enemies' intelligences. The initial roster was reduced although six more characters became available by September 2011 alongside an updated version. Billy Kane was included as a result of his popularity within fans, although some were confused by the absence of Iori Yagami. Depending on the game's popularity, the staff may port it to other consoles.

The King of Fighters-i 2012, an updated version featuring 12 new characters and other modes, was released for the iOS platform on May 3, 2012 and on Android as The King of Fighters-A 2012 on August 31, 2012.

Though all EX DLC form characters are also downloadable in these mobile versions, Mr. Karate and a human form of Saiki, who are still console-exclusive characters, are not included.

The King of Fighters XIII: Climax
A new arcade version of the game, titled The King of Fighters XIII: Climax, was announced in February 2012. It added the characters introduced on the console version and featured additional rebalancing. Location tests began that same month. Climax was officially released in Japanese arcades on April 26, 2012.

A Windows port, featuring all three DLC characters, was released on Steam in September 2013. This port is based on the Climax release for arcades. A Galaxy Edition also based on the Climax release was released on GOG.com on September 14, 2018.

Merchandise
An official guidebook from the series was published by Arcadia in Japan on August 6, 2010, as The King of Fighters XIII Master Guide. An official soundtrack was released on August 4, 2010. It is composed of two CDs, with the first one having 15 tracks and the second 37. A four-CD official soundtrack The King of Soundtracks was included with the English pre-orders of the game.

Reception

Following its release, The King of Fighters XIII received positive reviews, taking an average of 77 and 79 out of 100 on Metacritic. GameSpot awarded it as Best Fighting Game of the Year and as the Most Improved Sequel. It was also nominated for 2011 Spike Video Game Awards, 2011 Golden Joystick Awards and Academy of Interactive Arts & Sciences's 2012 D.I.C.E. Summit awards for the best fighting game of the year, but every time lost to Mortal Kombat.

The gameplay was given major praise with critics from GameSpot and 1UP.com comparing it with critically acclaimed fighting games like Street Fighter IV and finding the execution satisfying despite possible difficulties to newcomers to the franchise. The visual presentation was complimented to the point GamePro stated that the game "has an incredibly distinct – and incredibly beautiful – visual style to it." SNK Playmore was noted to have listened to all the fans' concerns regarding the game as the character roster was increased, with the notable return of fan favorite characters. On the other hand, the game has received criticism as a result of its story mode which is nearly inaccessible to those unfamiliar with the series as well as its use of illustrations alongside large paragraphs telling the plot. Similar comments were given to the online modes as it lacked options to allow players to watch other online fights.

The PlayStation 3 version of the game sold 21,525 copies in Japan during its first week of release. At the game's (and the series') Evolution Championship Series debut in 2012, it became the second-most-watched game of the series at over 90,000 consecutive viewers, thanks to a highly competitive tournament. In 2012, Complex ranked it as the third best SNK fighting game ever made, calling it "one of this generation’s finest fighters." The magazine also ranked it as the eighth best 2D fighting game of all time in 2013, stating: "A hit at EVO both this year, and the last, we predict that XIII will be sticking around for years to come." GamesRadar listed it as the 8th best fighting from its generation.

References

External links

The King of Fighters XIII
 

The King of Fighters XIII: Climax
 
Official Steam Edition website

2010 video games
2D fighting games
Android (operating system) games
Arcade video games
Atlus games
Fighting games used at the Evolution Championship Series tournament
Fighting games used at the Super Battle Opera tournament
IOS games
PlayStation 3 games
SNK Playmore games
The King of Fighters games
Fighting games
Windows games
Xbox 360 games
NESiCAxLive games
Multiplayer and single-player video games
Video games developed in Japan
Video games scored by Iku Mizutani
Video games set in Brazil
Video games set in India
Video games set in China
Video games set in England
Video games set in France
Video games set in Egypt
Video games set in Japan
Video games set in the United States
Rising Star Games games